For the People could refer to:

Television
For the People (1965 TV series), 1965 American TV series
For the People (2002 TV series), 2002 American TV series
For the People (2018 TV series), 2018 American TV series

Politics, law, government
For the People (Slovakia), political party in Slovakia
For the People Act of 2019, Bill of the 116th U.S. Congress
"For The People", slogan used by the Kamala Harris 2020 presidential campaign
For the People (Georgia), political party in Georgia

Other uses
For the People (Boot Camp Clik album), 1997
For the People (Jerome Cooper album), 1980
For the People (KVNU radio program), 2006 American radio program

See also

 
"4 the people" (KARK), slogan of KARK-TV, Little Rock, Arkansas, USA
4 the People, a 2004 Malayalam film
4 the People (TV series), 2015–2016 Malayalam TV series